Manuel Salvador Gutiérrez Castro (born January 20, 1987) is a Nicaraguan football Federación defender.

Club career
He has played for Diriangén before joining Managua in January 2012.

International career
Gutiérrez made his debut for Nicaragua in a January 2011 Copa Centroamericana match against Belize and has, as of December 2013, earned a total of 4 caps, scoring no goals. He has represented his country in 1 FIFA World Cup qualification match and played at the 2011 Copa Centroamericana.

References

External links
 

1987 births
Living people
Association football defenders
Nicaraguan men's footballers
Nicaragua international footballers
Diriangén FC players
Managua F.C. players
2011 Copa Centroamericana players